Josuha Jérémy Akoi Fara Guilavogui (born 19 September 1990) is a French professional footballer who plays as a defensive midfielder for Bundesliga club VfL Wolfsburg.

Early life
Guilavogui was born in Ollioules, France, to Guinean parents. They was from Macenta, Nzérékoré Region.

Club career

Saint-Étienne
Guilavogui played for Saint-Étienne from 2005 after joining the Rhône-Alpes-based club from his local club Toulon. He was promoted to the senior squad following the firing of Laurent Roussey and the hiring of new manager Christophe Galtier, who was looking to reshuffle Saint-Étienne's defense and fill the squad, which was decimated with injuries.

Guilavogui made his professional debut on 3 January 2009 coming on as a late substitute in Saint-Étienne's 1–0 victory over Bordeaux in the Coupe de France.

Atlético Madrid
On 2 September 2013, it was reported that Guilavogui had passed medical with La Liga outfit Atlético Madrid and signed a 5-year contract in a deal worth €10 million.

On 31 January 2014 Guilavogui was loaned back to Ligue 1 side Saint-Étienne until the end of the season.

VfL Wolfsburg
On 8 August 2014, VfL Wolfsburg signed Guilavogui on a two-year loan deal from Atlético Madrid with an option of a permanent transfer included in the deal. The club exercised their option to buy on 18 May 2016 and signed Guilavogui permanently on a three-year deal for a fee of €3m.

On 30 May 2015, Guilavogui came off the bench as Wolfsburg won the DFB-Pokal for the first time defeating, Borussia Dortmund 3–1 at the Olympiastadion in Berlin.

Loan to Bordeaux 
On 30 January 2022, Guilavogui signed for Ligue 1 club Bordeaux on loan until the end of the season. The deal included a buy option.

International career
Born in France, Guilavogui is of Guinean descent. He has played for the France national team.

Personal life
Guilavogui was born in Ollioules, Var. He is the brother of the Guinea international footballer Morgan Guilavogui.

Career statistics

International

Honours
Saint-Étienne
Coupe de la Ligue: 2012–13

VfL Wolfsburg
DFB-Pokal: 2014–15
DFL-Supercup: 2015

References

External links

 Profile at the VfL Wolfsburg website
 
 
 
 

1990 births
Living people
People from Ollioules
Sportspeople from Var (department)
French footballers
France under-21 international footballers
France international footballers
Association football midfielders
AS Saint-Étienne players
Atlético Madrid footballers
VfL Wolfsburg players
FC Girondins de Bordeaux players
Ligue 1 players
La Liga players
Bundesliga players
French expatriate footballers
Expatriate footballers in Germany
Expatriate footballers in Spain
French expatriate sportspeople in Germany
French expatriate sportspeople in Spain
Black French sportspeople
French sportspeople of Guinean descent
Footballers from Provence-Alpes-Côte d'Azur